The 1879 Mataura by-election was a by-election held on 15 January 1879 during the 6th New Zealand Parliament in the electorate of  in Southland.

The by-election was caused by the resignation of the incumbent MP William Wood on 10 December 1878.
  
The by-election was won by James Shanks.

Both Shanks and Kinross were described as "Greyites" or Government supporters, though Shank's views were said to be much more moderate than those of Kinross.

Results
The following table gives the election result:

Notes

Mataura 1879
1879 elections in New Zealand
January 1879 events
Politics of Southland, New Zealand